Ties that Bind is a 2011 drama film directed by Leila Djansi and starring Kimberly Elise, Omotola Jalade Ekeinde and Ama K. Abebrese. It was filmed in Ghana. It was nominated in 21 categories at the 2011 Ghana Movie Awards, and won 9 awards.  It received 7 nominations at the 8th Africa Movie Academy Awards and eventually won the award for the category Achievement in Screenplay.

Cast
Kimberly Elise as Theresa Harper
Ama K. Abebrese as Buki Ocansey
Omotola Jalade Ekeinde as Adobea Onyomena
John Dumelo as Lucas Morison
Ebbe Bassey as Maa Dede
Kofi Adjorlolo
Fiifi Coleman as Eddie
Eddie Nartey
Khareema Aquiar
Randall Batinkoff as Dan Dubick
 David Dontoh
 Dave Harper
 Paulina Oduro
 Kofi Middleton Mends
 Fred Amugi
 Okyeame Kwame
 Grace Nortey
 Angel Etse
 Kofi Asamoah
 Khareemar Aguiar
 Ziggy Nettyson

Reception
The film received mostly positive reviews from critics, especially for its acting and directing. Nollywood Reinvented gave it a 79% rating and wrote on the transition of the script "It is one thing to write a story, Any story… anyone can do it… once upon a time… and that is the end of my story. But it’s a whole other ball game to construct a story in which every little detail ties together. A story like this is a story in which the characters need not tell us what to feel, you feel it regardless. The story is really sad, and just when you think it can’t possibly get any sadder. It does! It’s an incredibly easy and quick watch… ".

References 

2011 films
2011 drama films
Films set in Africa
Best Screenplay Africa Movie Academy Award winners
Films shot in Ghana
2010s English-language films
English-language Ghanaian films
Films directed by Leila Djansi